Batesbeltia is a genus of beetles in the family Cerambycidae, containing the following species:

 Batesbeltia beltii (Bates, 1872)
 Batesbeltia cerussata Lane, 1964
 Batesbeltia pantherina Lane, 1964
 Batesbeltia pullata Lane, 1964
 Batesbeltia verecunda Lane, 1964

References

Anisocerini